Adraga is a genus of flies in the family Stratiomyidae.

Species
Adraga australis James, 1948
Adraga crassivena Kertész, 1916
Adraga dimidiata James, 1977
Adraga semiglabra James, 1980
Adraga tomentosa James, 1980
Adraga univitta Walker, 1858
Adraga varipes James, 1980

References

Stratiomyidae
Brachycera genera
Taxa named by Francis Walker (entomologist)
Diptera of Australasia